Guillermo de Jesús Buitrago Henríquez, known as Guillermo Buitrago (1 April 1920, Ciénaga – 19 April 1949) was a Colombian composer and songwriter of vallenato music. He is one of the most successful composers in his country. His songs became part of the typical music played during Christmas time in Colombia. Some of his hits are "La Víspera de Año Nuevo" (New Year's Eve), "Grito Vagabundo" (Vagabond Scream), "Ron de Vinola" (Vinola Rum) and "Dame tu mujer, José" (Give me your woman, José).

Buitrago was blonde, fair skinned, tall, neatly coiffed, tie with a perfect knot, and a triumphant smile that accentuated his prominent chin and his pronounced ears. His father, Guillermo Buitrago Muñoz, was from the region of Antioquia and arrived to Ciénaga from Marinilla, most likely attracted by the "banana boom" that had been dominating Magdalena's economy for several years already by that point. There, Buitrago Muñoz married Teresa Henríquez, a native of Ciénaga, and they had 7 children, 5 of which would die before turning 30. Amongst them was Guillermo, who died at 29 when he was about to sign a big contract that was going to launch his career internationally.

Biography 
At 18, Buitrago was already working as an in-house guitarist on a program called La hora infantil on the radio station Ecos del Córdoba, on which children from all the local towns would sing, competing for a prize. Buitrago started visiting radio stations to play his music, and finally had a stroke of luck at Radio Magdalena in the city of Santa Marta, where he would gain sufficient experience for his next career step in the coastal city of Barranquilla.

Buitrago since his adolescence had sought out business to record commercial jingles. On numerous occasions Buitrago explored various opportunities to make songs to promote products or brands. Amongst numerous brand names, he recorded jingles for Ginger Ale and Cerveza Águila. Perhaps the most famous was "El ron motilón", which promoted a rum from the province of Santander, and the long-running Colombian Christmas classic "El ron de vinola", which promoted a type of sugar cane juice that was said to have similarities to wine.

Seven or eight radio shows later, along with a successful jingle ''El Negro Mendo'' that he recorded for a furniture and mattress factory, convinced the station directors to give him more air time during prime time, ultimately giving him 3 shows weekly. By 1947 Buitrago was basically living in Barranquilla. During the week he would complete his radio show commitments that were starting to flood in by this point, and on weekends he would travel to Ciénaga to visit his family and friends. Emisoras Unidas, realizing the growing success of Buitrago's music, contracted Julio Bovea, who had just split from Buitrago and had formed his own band to take on an air slot that would compete directly with Buitrago's programming. Pressed to find replacements, Buitrago contacted two musicians he had played with in years prior. With this new group, he would go on to record the majority of his hits, all of which are still known today. Guillermo Buitrago y sus muchachos, his band, had Ángel Fontanilla on lead guitar, Buitrago on rhythm guitar and lead singer, and Carlos "stumpy" Rubio on guacharaca (Rubio was missing part of his left forearm).

What came next was fame and success. Aside from radio, private parties, local fairs, serenades, by 1947 Toño Fuentes, founder of Discos Fuentes in Medellín and pioneer of the LP industry in Colombia, arrived in Barranquilla looking for Buitrago's band to take them to make a recording at his studio in Cartagena. Elsewhere, Odeón Records of Argentina had also contacted Buitrago, producing some recording that had won a strong following nationally, so much that plans were put in motion to have Buitrago and his band tour the south of the South America.

Two successful years later, Guillermo Buitrago woke up on a day in January 1949, sick and short on sleep. At first he suspected too many performances had him fatigued, but as the weeks passed by, he started realizing he had an illness that was threatening to become critical. Locals claimed he had a weakened voice and that his ''young handsome face looked like a specter with burning dark circles around his eyes''. Guillermo Buitrago died on 19 April 1949 at the age of 29 years. The exact reason of his death remains a mystery. and there is no shortage of rumors and suspicions surrounding the young singer's demise.

Discography 
His music was originally distributed in 78 rpm records. Nobody knows exactly how many songs he recorded, but they were said to be more than 150 songs. His record producers were "Discos Fuentes", who have compiled most of his songs in LPs and CDs. Odeón Argentina and Chile released a few of his songs and some of that Odeón material was also released by Discos Fuentes. Some of his most important records are summarized below.

 Víspera de año nuevo
 "Las mujeres a mí no me quieren"
 "Compae Heliodoro"
 "La hija de mi comadre"
 "Ron de vinola"
 "Qué criterio"
 "El hijo de la luna"
 "Grito vagabundo"
 "El huerfanito"
 "La víspera de año nuevo"
 "La araña picua"
 "Dame tu mujer José"
 "La vida es un relajo"

 Guillermo Buitrago inédito
 Se marchitaron las flores
 La loca Rebeca
 Muchacha patillalera
 Gallo basto y pelao
 El toque de queda
 El desdichado
 La cita
 Careperro
 Cinco noches de velorio
 Las contradicciones
 El gallo atravesao
 El tigre guapo
 El maromero
 Buitrago me tiene un pique

 La piña madura
 La capuchona
 Adiós mi maye (la despedida)
 Cienaguera
 La carta
 El testamento
 El tiburón de marbella
 El amor de claudia
 Pacha rosado
 La piña madura
 La varita de caña
 Espera que me muera
 El compa'e Miguel (el ermitaño).

 Regalito de navidad
A Little Christmas gift, this long play was edited by Discos Fuentes. Among the 12 songs in the album, four were recorded after Buitrago's death by another singer called, Julio C. San Juan. The songs were San Juan performs in Guillermo Buitrago's place are marked with an asterisk.
 Regalito de navidad (*)
 Palomita mensajera (*)
 Yo no monto en avión (*)
 El amor es un collar
 Las sábanas del diluvio
 Luis Eduardo
 Rosa Valencia (*)
 La peste
 Pacho y Abraham
 Los enanos
 El brujo de Arjona (El enviado)
 Moralito

 El testamento y otros cantos ineditos
 El cazador
 La mujer que quiere a uno
 La fiera de pabayo
 Pacho y Abraham
 La costumbre de los pueblos
 El testamento
 La matica de yuca
 Espera que muera
 El dolor de Micaela
 La vida es un relajo

 

Vispera de Año Nuevo EP
 Discos Fuentes – 600083 Format: Vinyl, 7", 33 ⅓ RPM, EP
 A1		Compae Heliodoro
 A2		El Hijo de la Luna
 B1		Víspera de Año Nuevo
 B3		Dame tu Mujer Jose

Compilation album 
A CD was produced to restore and compile some of his greatest hits, called 16 Éxitos de Navidad y Año Nuevo. Two of the songs were cut at the very beginning and are missing a small part of the original intro.  Also, percussion and a bass were added to almost all the songs, differing from the original tracks:
 Víspera De Año Nuevo
 Ron De Vinola
 Dame Tu Mujer José
 Grito Vagabundo
 El Huerfanito
 Compa'e Heliodoro
 El Amor De Claudia
 La Carta
 La Araña Picua
 La Piña Madura
 La Hija De Mi Comadre
 Qué Criterio
 Las Mujeres A Mi No Me Quieren
 Cienaguera
 El Testamento
 El Brujo De Arjona

Other songs released in 78s 
Some other songs that have only ever been released in 78s and never reissued as LPs or CDs (and thus they have disappeared almost completely, or only collectors possess them) include:
 Buitrago me tiene un pique (1st version)
 Como se pierde se gana (bolero)
 Compay Chaney (El zorro)
 El bachiller
 El bobo de la yuca (Buitrago just did backing vocals)
 El coco rayado
 El día de San Sebastián (El caimán)
 El doctor Rafael Lavalle
 El compa´e Miguel (1st version)
 El jerre jerre - El negro maldito
 El negro Mendo
 La estricnina
 La vaca lechera
 Linda nena
 Los panderos de Río Frío
 Mi guayabo
 Mil veces (Lombo)
 Mi morenita
 Petra la pelua
 Santo Tomás
 Zorro chucho, marimonda y baco

In addition to those, the following are completely unavailable:
 El alazanito
 Mala noche (El negrito figurín)
 Toño Miranda en el Valle
 Falsas caricias
 Anhelos
 Los choferes
 La rosca
 Teresa Mercedes
 Las muchachas de Buitrago
 Ritmo colombiano (Mi Colombia) (Buitrago just did backing vocals)
 La cañandonga

Radio advertising 
Buitrago also recorded a number of songs for radio advertising that were never commercially released:
 Ron Añejo (*)
 Ron Motilón (*)
 Radio document (advertising Butrago's radio programme) (*)
 Canada Dry
 Nutrimalta
 La Costeña (a tailor shop)
 El Colegio (a food supply and liquor store)
 La piladora de Tomás
 Farmacia San José
 Farmacia Royal
 Almendra Tropical (a café)
 Muebles la Fama (a furniture shop)
 Gentleman (Colombian cigarettes)
 La Mayorquina (a candy store)
 Flor del campo (a bakery)

The songs marked with an asterisk are the only ones for which a recording by Buitrago has been found.

References 

 Guillermo Buitrago cantor del pueblo para todos los tiempos (biography), Édgar Caballero Elías, Discos Fuentes.
 Gabriel Velez's collection.
 Guillermo Buitrago, la primera leyenda del vallenato

1920 births
1949 deaths
Colombian classical guitarists
Colombian composers
20th-century Colombian male singers
Colombian singer-songwriters
People from Magdalena Department
Vallenato musicians